Vaseegara is a 2003 Indian Tamil-language romantic comedy film directed by K. Selva Bharathy. It is the Tamil remake of the 2001 Telugu film, Nuvvu Naaku Nachav. The film stars Vijay and Sneha, while Vadivelu, Nassar, Gayatri Jayaraman   and Manivannan play supporting roles.

The film released on 15 January 2003. It received mixed reviews and became a moderate success. The Telugu movie was also remade into Bengali titled, Majnu, directed by Rajiv Kumar Biswas, starring Hiran, Shrabanti. The film's title is based on a song of the same name from Minnale.

Plot
Bhoopathy is a happy-go-lucky youth from Pollachi who is sent by his father Mani Gounder to stay with his best friend Vishwanathan at Villivakkam, so that he can get a job and behave responsibly. Kattabomman is Vishwanathan's assistant who torments Bhoopathy right from the day they meet. Priya is Vishwanathan's daughter who is engaged to an NRI groom Prakash. Priya and Bhoopathy are at loggerheads with each other and constantly fight and play pranks on each other. Soon, however, Priya falls for Bhoopathy. While Bhoopathy also loves Priya back, he realises that she is already engaged to another man and is also reminded of his father's words that he (Bhoopathy) should not make him (father) lose face with his friend under any circumstances. With this in mind, he starts to keep a distance from Priya and decides to return to Pollachi, only to be stopped by Vishwanathan.

Some days later, Priya, along with Bhoopathy and Priya's younger cousin sister Pappi, go to Ooty to attend the wedding of Priya's friend Asha. At Ooty, Bhoopathy attends the bachelor party of the groom Sriman. While drunk, he reveals his feelings about Priya. After the marriage, Bhoopathy, Priya and Pappi, along with a photographer, go on a day-out to Black Thunder, where the photographer takes a photo of Bhoopathy and Priya holding hands. Bhoopathy keeps snubbing Priya and her romantic overtures to him during the trip as he is reminded of his promise to his father but cannot forget her.

On the day before Priya's wedding, Mani arrives in Chennai and knows about the relationship between Bhoopathy and Priya. Later that night, Prakash and his family see the photo of Bhoopathy and Priya holding hands and Prakash's father decides to call off the wedding unless Vishwanathan can pay 1 crore to him, which Vishwanathan refuses to do. When Vishwanathan confronts Priya, Priya's aunt, who is aware of the love Priya has for Bhoopathy as well as Bhoopathy's dilemma, reveals the truth to Vishwanathan. Meanwhile, Bhoopathy is at the railway station, trying to convince Prakash to marry Priya. Vishwanathan, who has also arrived at the railway station, sees this, and realising the true reasons behind Bhoopathy backing out over his love for Priya, sends Prakash and his family away and accepts Bhoopathy's relationship with Priya. In the end, Bhoopathy marries Priya.

Cast

Production
K. Selva Bharathy, who had worked previously with Vijay in Ninaithen Vandhai and Priyamaanavale, opted to remake the 2001 Telugu hit Nuvvu Naaku Nachav into Tamil with his previous film Priyamaanavale'''s cast Vijay and Simran. But Sneha was signed on to be a part of the film. Gayatri Jayaraman was also signed on to play a supporting role.

A song from the film was canned in New Zealand, while filming was also carried out in Ooty, Tamil Nadu and scenes were shot at Birla Planetarium and MGM Dizzee world.

Soundtrack

Vaseegara's soundtrack was composed by S.A. Rajkumar, which marked his fourth and final collaboration with Vijay after Poove Unakkaga, Thulladha Mananum Thullum & Priyamaanavale. While "Aaha Enparkal" and "Poopola Theepola" were reused from the original, "Venaam Venaam" was reused from "Vaana Vaana" from Daddy, also composed by Rajkumar.

Release
The film grossed 8 crore during its lifetime due to mixed reviews from critics. Sify gave 3 stars out of 5 and stated "Vaseegara is Romantic-Comedy entertainment that leaves you with a smile on your face", calling it "a perfect outing with your family this festival season". Ananda Vikatan rated the film 41 out of 100. NowRunning.com stated "I strongly believe Vijay has never been so hilarious before [...] all the characters have done their part well, especially Puppy" and rated 3 stars out of 5. The movie opened alongside several prominent films such as the Vikram starrer Dhool. It was later dubbed in Hindi as Ek Aur Loafer'' by Wide Angle Media Pvt Ltd in 2013.

The satellite rights of the film were sold to Jaya TV.

References

External links
 

2003 films
Tamil remakes of Telugu films
2000s Tamil-language films
Films scored by S. A. Rajkumar
Indian romantic comedy films
Films shot in Ooty
Films shot in New Zealand
Films directed by K. Selva Bharathy
2003 romantic comedy films